Sodium aurothiosulfate, or sanocrysin, is the inorganic compound with the formula . This salt contains an anionic coordination complex of gold(I) bound to two thiosulfate ligands. It is colorless.

History 
The compound was first synthesized in 1845 by Mathurin-Joseph Fordos and A. Gélis who were researching chemicals used in the Daguerrotype photographic process. It then came to be called Fordos and Gélis salt. It went out of interest until 1924 when it was noted as a chemotherapeutic agent for tuberculosis by Holger Møllgaard in Copenhagen. Other methods of synthesis were then identified.

Potential applications
Like several other gold compounds, this species is used as an antirheumatic. The first placebo-controlled trial was probably conducted in 1931, when sanocrysin was compared with distilled water for the treatment of tuberculosis.

Aurothiosulfate complexes have been discussed in the context of the extraction of gold from its ores. The general approach would employ sodium or ammonium thiosulfate in place of cyanide salts as lixiviants.

References 

Thiosulfates
Gold(I) compounds
Sodium compounds
Antirheumatic products
Metal-containing drugs
Gold–sulfur compounds
Aurates

Source of Chemical Formula: http://medical.merriam-webster.com/medical/gold%20sodium%20thiomalate